Iu Wai (born 9 November 1991 in Hong Kong) is a former Hong Kong professional football player last played for Hong Kong First Division League club Hong Kong Sapling. His position is defender.

Playing career
He made his debut on 14 October 2007 at the game versus Kitchee.

His career came to an abrupt end after he was involved in a match-fixing case during a U21 friendly match against Russia back in 2011 where he attempted to bribe two fellow U21 players Chiu Yu-Ming and Chan Cham-Hei to throw the match in return for payment. However, the two declined Iu's offer and reported the case to the anti-corruption authorities. Iu, later admitted and pleaded guilty to two counts of bribery.

Career statistics

Club

References 

Hong Kong footballers
Fourway Athletics players
1991 births
Living people
Hong Kong First Division League players
Hong Kong Rangers FC players
Dreams Sports Club players
Association football defenders